David Schneider may refer to:

 Dave Schneider (politician) (born 1957), member of the Alberta Legislative Assembly
 Dave Schneider (musician) (born 1963), American musician
 David Schneider (actor) (born 1963), English actor and comedian
 David Schneider (writer), American film writer (Stark Raving Mad), director and actor
 David Schneider (tennis) (born 1955), former pro tennis player
 David Schneider (ice hockey) (born 1979), American professional ice hockey player
 David Schneider (orienteer), Swiss orienteer
 David J. Schneider, American psychologist
 David M. Schneider (1918–1995), American cultural anthropologist
 David T. Schneider (1922–2008), American diplomat